This is a list of named geological features on Pluto, identified by scientists working with data from the New Horizons spacecraft. The International Astronomical Union (IAU) officially approved the first 14 names on 8 August 2017 (announced 7 September 2017), with additional names following in each subsequent year, but many of the names listed on this page are still informal. The IAU has determined that names will be chosen from the following themes:
 Names for the underworld from the world's mythologies
 Gods, goddesses, and dwarfs associated with the underworld
 Heroes and other explorers of the underworld
 Writers associated with Pluto and the Kuiper belt
 Pioneering space missions and spacecraft
 Scientists and engineers associated with Pluto and the Kuiper belt

Cavi 

A cavus is a hollow or steep-sided depression. The following is a list of official and unofficial names chosen by the New Horizons team.

Colles 

A collis is a low hill. Plutonian colles are named after spacecraft that operated in Earth orbit. The following is a list of official and unofficial names chosen by the New Horizons team.

Craters 

Plutonian craters are named after scientists and other people associated with the study of Pluto. The following is a list of official and unofficial names chosen by the New Horizons team.

Dorsa 

A dorsum is a ridge. Plutonian dorsa are named after underworlds in mythology. The following is a list of official and unofficial names chosen by the New Horizons team.

Fluctūs 

A Fluctus is a terrain covered by outflow of liquid. Plutonian fluctūs are named after travellers to the underworld. The following is a list of official and unofficial names chosen by the New Horizons team.

Fossae 

A fossa is a ditch-like feature. Plutonian fossae are named after figures associated with underworld myths. The following is a list of official and unofficial names chosen by the New Horizons team.

Lacūs 

A lacus is a small plain, derived from the word . The following is a list of names chosen by the New Horizons team.

Lineae 

A linea is an elongated marking. Plutonian lineae are named after space probes. The following is a list of official and unofficial names chosen by the New Horizons team.

Maculae 

A macula is a dark spot. Plutonian maculae are named after underworld creatures from fiction and mythology. The following is a list of names chosen by the New Horizons team. Names that have been officially approved are labeled as such.

Montes 

A mons is a mountain. Plutonian montes (mountain ranges) are named after explorers and adventurers. The following is a list of names chosen by the New Horizons team. Names that have been officially approved are labeled as such.

a.
b.

Paludes 

A palus (literally ) is a small plain. Paludes on Pluto are named after historic explorers. The following is a list of names chosen by the New Horizons team. Names that have been officially approved are labeled as such.

Plana 
A planum is a plateau or high plain. One (Sputnik Planum) was initially identified on Pluto; but it has since been recognized to be a planitia.

Planitiae 

A planitia is a low plain, distinct from plana as they are located on lower terrain. The following is a list of names chosen by the New Horizons team. Names that have been officially approved are labeled as such.

Regiones 

A regio is a region geographically distinct from its surroundings. Plutonian regiones are named after underworld spirits in fiction and mythology, or after scientists associated with the study of Pluto. The following is a list of names chosen by the New Horizons team. Names that have been officially approved are labeled as such. One such feature, the former Cthulhu Regio, is now considered to be a macula.

Rupēs 

A rupes is an escarpment. Plutonian rupēs are  named after explorers. The following is a list of names chosen by the New Horizons team. Names that have been officially approved are labeled as such.

Terrae 

A terra is an extensive landmass. Plutonian terrae are named after space probes. The following is a list of names chosen by the New Horizons team. Names that have been officially approved are labeled as such.

Valles 

A vallis is a valley. Plutonian valles are named after historic explorers. The following is a list of names chosen by the New Horizons team. Names that have been officially approved are labeled as such.

See also 
 Geography of Pluto
 Geology of Pluto
 List of geological features on Charon

References

External links 
 Official list of Pluto's features (IAU)
 Map of Pluto

Geography of Pluto
Pluto